Robin Welch (23 July 1936 – 5 December 2019) was a studio potter.

Robin Welch was born in Nuneaton, Warwickshire. In 1953, he studied art at Penzance School of Art in Cornwall, and in 1956 he studied at Central Saint Martins, London. Between 1953 and 1959, he worked at the Leach Pottery. 

He moved to Australia for several years before returning to England in 1965 and setting up Stradbroke Pottery in Eye, Suffolk.
He designed for Wedgwood, Midwinter Pottery and Denby Pottery Company.

His work is held by the Victoria and Albert Museum.

References

1936 births
2019 deaths
Studio pottery
English potters
English ceramicists
Alumni of the Central School of Art and Design
20th-century British artists
20th-century ceramists
21st-century British artists
21st-century ceramists